Fee-Charging Employment Agencies Convention (Revised), 1949 is  an International Labour Organization Convention.

It was established in 1949, with the preamble stating:
Having decided upon the adoption of certain proposals with regard to the revision of the Fee-Charging Employment Agencies Convention, 1933,..

Modification 
The convention is a revision of ILO Convention C34, Fee-Charging Employment Agencies Convention, 1933 (shelved).

Ratifications
As of 2023, the convention has been ratified by 42 states. Of the ratifying states, 20 have subsequently denounced the convention, some by an automatic process that denounces the 1949 convention when another superseding convention is ratified by the same state.

External links 
Text.
Ratifications.

Employment agencies
International Labour Organization conventions
Treaties entered into force in 1951
Treaties concluded in 1949
Treaties of Argentina
Treaties of Bangladesh
Treaties of Bolivia
Treaties of Costa Rica
Treaties of Ivory Coast
Treaties of Cuba
Treaties of Djibouti
Treaties of the United Arab Republic
Treaties of the French Fourth Republic
Treaties of Gabon
Treaties of Ghana
Treaties of Guatemala
Treaties of Ireland
Treaties of the Kingdom of Libya
Treaties of Luxembourg
Treaties of Malta
Treaties of Mauritania
Treaties of Mexico
Treaties of the Dominion of Pakistan
Treaties of Senegal
Treaties of the Dominion of Ceylon
Treaties of Eswatini
Treaties of the Syrian Republic (1930–1963)
Treaties of Turkey
1949 in labor relations